Ferdinand Čatloš (October 7, 1895 – December 16, 1972), born Csatlós Nándor, was a Slovak military officer and politician. Throughout his short career in the administration of the Slovak Republic he held the post of Minister of Defence. He was also the commanding officer of the Field Army Bernolák during the 15 day Slovak Invasion of Poland and Operation Barbarossa. On 2 August 1944 he abandoned his post and joined the partisan fighters. At the conclusion of World War II, he was imprisoned for five years by the National Court of Bratislava and released in 1948. He spent the remainder of his life working as an ordinary clerk in Martin, Czechoslovakia. He then died in 1972.

On 1 September 1939, the Slovak Republic with three Infantry divisions under his general command attacked Poland and only met some resistance and quickly over-ran the Poles and took some land in Poland for Slovakia. While only losing 37 killed, 114 wounded, 11 missing and 2 aircraft shot down. After serving in Poland, his army moved towards the east of Slovakia to join the German invasion of Russia, Operation Barbarossa.

References 

1895 births
1972 deaths
People from Liptovský Mikuláš District
People from the Kingdom of Hungary
Slovak Lutherans
Defence Ministers of Slovakia
Slovak military personnel
Slovak people of World War II
20th-century Lutherans
Burials at National Cemetery in Martin